Shawn Lenor Hollingsworth (born December 4, 1961) is a former American football offensive tackle who played one season with the Denver Broncos of the National Football League. He first enrolled at the University of New Mexico before transferring to the Angelo State University. He attended Brownwood High School in Brownwood, Texas.

References

External links
Just Sports Stats

Living people
1961 births
Players of American football from Texas
American football offensive tackles
New Mexico Lobos football players
Angelo State Rams football players
Denver Broncos players
People from Brownwood, Texas